Lyndale Secondary College is a co-educational government secondary school located in Dandenong North, Victoria, Australia. It has a student enrolment of approximately 1,200, and is known as one of the largest single campus schools in Victoria.

The school is divided into two sub-schools—a middle school and a senior school. Its acting principal is Pam Robinson, and there are also two vice principals.

The principal features of the campus are the Hugh McRae Hall, a Resource Centre (Library), a Senior Studies Wing, a  Language Centre (West Wing), the well-equipped Graeme Fox Stadium, a STEM Centre, and recently completed Performing Arts centre.

Headstart Program
The Headstart Program is a new initiative that the college has launched where students from Year 7 to 11 commence the new school year late in November (25 November in 2013). The program lasts for 3 weeks with studies resulting in an assessment task/outcome.

A feature of the school is the SEAL (Select Entry Accelerated Learning) program.

The highest ATAR score of Lyndale Secondary College was achieved by Jin (Sam) Shan in 2011, with an ATAR of 99.15.

Notable former students
Adam Collins – Journalist
John Farnham – Musician/singer

External links
 Lyndale Secondary College Website.

Public high schools in Victoria (Australia)
Educational institutions established in 1961
1961 establishments in Australia
Buildings and structures in the City of Greater Dandenong
Dandenong, Victoria